James Edward Baron (born March 20, 1954) is a retired American college basketball coach. He previously held the position of head coach at Saint Francis University, St. Bonaventure University, the University of Rhode Island and Canisius College.

Playing career
Baron lettered in basketball for four years (1973 to 1977) at St. Bonaventure University and helped St. Bonaventure win the 1977 National Invitation Tournament as a senior. Baron graduated from St. Bonaventure with a degree in physical education in 1977 and later earned  a master's degree in counseling from the same institution in 1988.

Coaching career
In 1977, Baron began his coaching career as an assistant coach at Aquinas Institute in Rochester, New York. The following year, Baron became an assistant coach at NCAA Division III University of Rochester. Baron moved up to Division I as an assistant for Loyola College in Maryland for the 1979–80 season. In 1980, Baron returned to his alma mater as assistant coach for St. Bonaventure.

From 1981 to 1987, Baron was an assistant coach at Notre Dame under Digger Phelps. Baron helped Notre Dame make the NCAA Tournaments of 1985, 1986, and 1987 and rank in the season-end top-25 polls in 1986 and 1987.

Baron first became a head coach in 1987 at Saint Francis University in Loretto, Pennsylvania. His teams showed improvement each of his first four seasons, culminating in an appearance in the 1991 NCAA tournament.

In 1992, Baron began a 20-season stint as a head coach in the Atlantic 10 Conference, returning to St. Bonaventure once again, this time as head coach. During his nine seasons as head coach, St. Bonaventure appeared in the 1995 National Invitation Tournament and 2000 NCAA tournament, the program's first NCAA Tournament appearance since 1978. As a #12 seed, St. Bonaventure lost 85–80 in double overtime to #5 Kentucky. The A-10 recognized Baron as Coach of the Year in 1995.

Baron became head coach at Rhode Island in 2001. After going 8–20 in his first season, Baron led Rhode Island to a 19–12 season the following year and won his second A-10 Coach of the Year award. Rhode Island spent four weeks ranked in the top-25 polls from December 24, 2007 to January 21, 2008. Rhode Island made three NIT appearances, including in the 2010 semifinals.

In April 2010, he agreed with Rhode Island to a contract extension through the 2013–14 season.  However, after a 7–24 season and a second-to-last place conference finish in 2011–12, the university terminated his contract on March 4, 2012. Rhode Island never appeared in the NCAA Tournament during Baron's tenure.

Canisius College hired Baron as men's basketball head coach on April 2, 2012. After four years at Canisius, Baron announced his retirement from coaching on May 20, 2016.

Personal life
Baron is the father of two professional basketball-playing sons, Jimmy and Billy Baron, both of whom he coached in college.

Head coaching record

References

1954 births
Living people
American men's basketball coaches
American men's basketball players
Basketball coaches from New York (state)
Basketball players from New York City
Canisius Golden Griffins men's basketball coaches
College men's basketball head coaches in the United States
Loyola Greyhounds men's basketball coaches
Notre Dame Fighting Irish men's basketball coaches
Rhode Island Rams men's basketball coaches
Rochester Zeniths players
Saint Francis Red Flash men's basketball coaches
Sportspeople from Brooklyn
St. Bonaventure Bonnies men's basketball coaches
St. Bonaventure Bonnies men's basketball players